Dedham is a town in and the county seat of Norfolk County, Massachusetts. The population was 25,364 at the 2020 census. It is located on Boston's southwest border. On the northwest it is bordered by Needham, on the southwest by Westwood, and on the southeast by Canton. The town was first settled by European colonists in 1635.

History

17th century
Settled in 1635 by people from Roxbury and Watertown, Dedham was incorporated in 1636. It became the county seat of Norfolk County when the county was formed from parts of Suffolk County on March 26, 1793. When the Town was originally incorporated, the residents wanted to name it "Contentment." The Massachusetts General Court overruled them and named the town after Dedham, Essex in England, where some of the original inhabitants were born. The boundaries of the town at the time stretched to the Rhode Island border.

At the first public meeting on August 15, 1636, eighteen men signed the town covenant. They swore that they would "in the fear and reverence of our Almighty God, mutually and severally promise amongst ourselves and each to profess and practice one truth according to that most perfect rule, the foundation whereof is ever lasting love."

They also agreed that "we shall by all means labor to keep off from us all such as are contrary minded, and receive only such unto us as may be probably of one heart with us, [and such] as that we either know or may well and truly be informed to walk in a peaceable conversation with all meekness of spirit, [this] for the edification of each other in the knowledge and faith of the Lord Jesus…" The covenant also stipulated that if differences were to arise between townsmen, they would seek arbitration for resolution and each would pay his fair share for the common good.

18th century
Just 15 months after asking for their own church, 40 men living on the north side of the Charles River suddenly asked the General Court to separate them from Dedham. Their petition cited the inadequate services provided, namely schools and churches. They also said that, if they were simply to be made a precinct instead of a separate town, that they would suffer political reprisals. Dedham agreed that the services were inadequate and did not oppose the separation, but did try to reduce the amount of land the separatists were seeking. Dedham also asked for a delay of one year. The General Court agreed with the petitioners, however, and created the new town of Needham with the original boundaries requested. Those who remained in Dedham still held rights to the unallotted lands in Needham, however, and any decrease in taxes would be offset by a decrease in expenditures. There may have also been some satisfaction in separating themselves from those on the other side of the 1704 power struggle.

In November 1798, David Brown led a group in Dedham protesting the federal government; they set up a liberty pole, as people had before the American Revolution. It carried the words, "No Stamp Act, No Sedition Act, No Alien Bills, No Land Tax, downfall to the Tyrants of America; peace and retirement to the President; Long Live the Vice President," referring to then-President John Adams and Vice President Thomas Jefferson. Brown was arrested in Andover but because he could not afford the $4,000 bail, he was taken to Salem for trial. Brown was tried in June 1799. Although he wanted to plead guilty, Justice Samuel Chase urged him to name those who had helped him or subscribed to his writings in exchange for freedom. Brown refused, was fined $480, and sentenced to eighteen months in prison. It was the most severe sentence up to then imposed under the Alien and Sedition Acts.

Dedham is home to the Fairbanks House, the oldest surviving timber-frame house in the United States, scientifically dated to 1637. On January 1, 1643, by unanimous vote, Dedham  authorized the first taxpayer-funded public school, "the seed of American education." Its first schoolmaster, Rev. Ralph Wheelock, a Clare College graduate, was paid 20 pounds annually to instruct the youth of the community. Descendants of these students would become presidents of Dartmouth College, Yale University and Harvard University.

The first man-made canal in North America, Mother Brook, was created in Dedham in 1639. It linked the Charles River to the Neponset River. Although both are slow-moving rivers, they are at different elevations. The difference in elevation made the canal's current swift enough to power several local mills.

19th century
In 1818, though citizens were still taxed for the support of ministers and other "public teachers of religion," Dedham set a precedent toward the separation of church and state. Residents of the town selected a minister different than that chosen by the church members; the selection by residents was confirmed by the Supreme Judicial Court. This decision increased support for the disestablishment of the Congregational churches.

The local Endicott Estate burned to the ground in 1904 after the local volunteer fire department, responding to three separate fires burning simultaneously, reached the Endicott fire last. By the time they arrived, only ashes remained. It is said that the estate's owner, Henry Bradford Endicott (also founder of the Endicott Johnson Corporation) took the burning of the homestead as a divine command to rebuild (which he did). The rebuilt Endicott Estate is listed on the National Register of Historic Places. The estate and surrounding grounds are open to the public, upholding Henry's stepdaughter Katherine's wish to use the house and property for "educational, civic, social and recreational purposes."

20th century
In 1921, the historic Sacco and Vanzetti trial was held in the Norfolk County Courthouse in Dedham. Dedham Pottery is a cherished class of antiques, characterized by a distinctive crackle glaze, blue-and-white color scheme, and a frequent motif of rabbits and other animals. Dedham is sometimes called the "mother of towns" because 14 present-day communities were included within its original broad borders.

Geography
Dedham is located at  (42.244609, −71.165531).

Dedham is made up of a number of neighborhoods:
 In the geographical center of town is Oakdale. It is roughly defined by East Street to the west, Cedar Street to the south and east, and Whiting Ave to the north. The houses in the area around Woodleigh Road, which was declared to be one of the best streets in Greater Boston, have many homes designed by Henry Bailey Alden, who also designed the Endicott Estate. Nearby the subdivision consisting of Morse Avenue, Fulton Street, and Edison Avenue, is named Whiting Park.
 Riverdale is an island surrounded by the Charles River and Long Ditch.
 Greenlodge runs along the axis of Greenlodge Street and the area between Greenlodge Street and East Street.
 The Manor comprises the neighborhood south of Sprague Street.
 East Dedham falls between Mother Brook and the Boston line.
 Precinct One, or Upper Dedham, is in the northwest corner of the town, between High Street and Common Street and the Westwood and Needham lines.
 Ashcroft is the neighborhood between Cedar Street and Sprague Street. It includes Paul Park and the Capen School.
 Fairbanks is the neighborhood between East Street and Wigwam Pond.

Climate
Dedham has a warm-summer humid continental climate (Dfb under the Köppen climate classification system), with high humidity and precipitation year-round.

Demographics

As of the census of 2000, there were 23,464 people, 8,654 households, and 6,144 families residing in the town. The racial makeup of the town was 94.51% White, 1.54% Black or African American, 0.16% Native American, 1.87% Asian, 0.04% Pacific Islander, 0.80% from other races, and 1.08% from two or more races. 2.42% of the population were Hispanic or Latino of any race.

There were 8,654 households, of which 30.1% had children under the age of 18 living with them. 56.3% were married couples living together, 11.1% had a female householder with no husband present, and 29.0% were non-families. 23.9% of all households were made up of individuals, and 10.4% had someone living alone who was 65 years of age or older. The average household size was 2.61 and the average family size was 3.14.

Dedham's population was spread out, with 22.2% under the age of 18, 5.8% from 18 to 24, 31.1% from 25 to 44, 24.2% from 45 to 64, and 16.6% who were 65 years of age or older. The median age was 40 years. For every 100 females, there were 93.4 males. For every 100 females age 18 and over, there were 92.0 males.

The median income for a household in the town was $61,699, and the median income for a family was $72,330. Males had a median income of $46,216 versus $35,682 for females. The per capita income for the town was $28,199. About 3.2% of families and 4.6% of the population were below the poverty line, including 3.9% of those under age 18 and 6.5% of those age 65 or over.

Religion

Seal and flag

The town's seal was originally designed by a member of the Dedham Historical Society. In the center is a crest containing the Old Avery Oak. When the tree was finally felled, the gavel used by the Moderator at Town Meeting was carved out of it. Above the tree are the scales of justice, representing Dedham as the county seat and home to Norfolk County's courts. On the left of the tree are agricultural instruments, and on the right is a factory, showing Dedham's history first as a town of farmers and then as one with a number of mills and factories, particularly along Mother Brook. Below the tree is a banner with the word "Contentment," the name of the original plantation.

The town flag is red with the seal prominent and in the center. In the lower left corner is part of the Avery Oak, and in the lower right is part of the Fairbanks House. It hangs in the selectmen's chambers at town hall and in the Great Hall of the Massachusetts State House.

Government
A charter adopted in 1998 lays out the basic structure of the Town government, although it has been amended occasionally over the years. A seven-member Charter Advisory Committee, appointed in 2012, recommended six substantial changes and numerous minor changes be made to the document. The Selectmen consolidated them into six articles for Town Meeting's consideration, and five were presented to the Meeting in 2013. Voters approved four of them in 2014. A version of the sixth and final proposal was adopted at the Spring 2014 Annual Town Meeting.

Town Meeting
According to Dedham's Charter, the "administration of all the fiscal, prudential, and municipal affairs of the town, with the government thereof, shall be vested in a legislative branch, to consist of a representative town meeting." Town Meeting is to consist of no less than 270 members, but not more than necessary to achieve an equal number coming from each precinct. There are currently seven districts, but could be as few as six or as many as nine, with lines drawn by the Select Board and the Registrars of Voters every ten years.

Votes are by voice unless members call for a standing or roll call vote, either of which can be called for by the Moderator. All Town officers are required to attend Town Meeting and multiple member bodies must send at least one representative who have all the privileges of a Member except the right to vote. If 5% of Town voters petition the Select Board within 14 days of Town Meeting, any action taken may be submitted to voters. The final result is to be determined by majority vote, but Town Meeting can not be overruled unless 20% of registered voters participate.

Town Meeting sets its own rules and keeps a journal of proceedings. The Town Meeting may establish various ad-hoc and standing committees on which any Town Meeting Member or voter may serve.

Before each Spring Annual Town Meeting, the Public Service Recognition Award is given to recognize citizens who have performed outstanding acts of service to the community.

Town Meeting members
Currently Town Meeting consists of 273 members, or representatives, with each of the seven districts, or precincts, electing 39. Thirteen are elected from each precinct each year and serve a three-year term. Each precinct elects from its own members a chairman, vice chairman, and secretary.

To be eligible, candidates must have 10 registered voters from their precinct sign nomination papers. Town Meeting Representatives can not serve on any other elected board or on the Finance and Warrant Committee. Members who move from the district or are removed by redistricting may serve until the next Town Election; however, any member who moves out of the Town immediately ceases to be a Member.

In case of a vacancy, the remaining term is to be filled at the next town election. If no election is to take place within 120 days of the vacancy, then the district chairman is to call together the members of the district, and they are to elect a member who will serve until the next town election.

Warrant
The Warrant at Town Meeting includes the articles to be voted on. Any elected or appointed board, committee, town officer, or any ten voters may place an article on the warrant. Each article to be voted on is directed by the Select Board to an appropriate board or committee to hear and provide the original motion at Town Meeting. All articles expending funds are directed to the Finance Committee; articles dealing with planning and zoning to the Planning Board; articles relating to by-laws to the By-Law Committee. The Finance Committee recommendation has the force of the original motion on all articles except those related to zoning. The Planning Board makes the original motion for those.

Mini Town Meeting
The chairmen of the several districts elect from amongst themselves a chairman. This Chairman of the chairmen hosts what is officially known as the District Chairmen's Warrant Review Meeting, but is much more commonly referred to as Mini Town Meeting. The "Mini," first held in 1978, is generally a week or two before the actual Town Meeting. The purpose of the Mini is to air out several of the contentious issues before bringing them to the floor of Town Meeting.

Select Board
The executive branch of the Town Government is "headed" by a Select Board. The Board has five members who are elected for three-year terms and are the chief policy making body for the town. They appoint a Town Manager who runs the day-to-day affairs of the Town. They also appoint constables, registrars of voters and other election officers, the board of appeals, conservation commission, historic district commission, and members of several other multiple member boards. James A. MacDonald serves as chair, with Kevin R. Coughlin serving as Vice Chair. Dimitria Sullivan, Erin Boles Welch, and Dennis J. Teehan, Jr. also serve as members.

Selectmen set policy for all departments below it, but are not involved in the day-to-day affairs of the Town. They issue licenses and can investigate the affairs and the conduct of any town agency.

Town Clerk
The Elected Town Clerk serves a three-year term and works full-time for the Town. The Clerk is "the keeper of vital statistics of the town and the custodian of the town seal and all public records, administer[s] the oaths of office to all town officers... [and is] the clerk of the town meeting." In the role as clerk of town meeting, he notifies the public and members of the Town Meeting and keeps a verbatim record of proceedings. The current Town Clerk is Paul Munchbach.

Town Moderator
Town Meetings are presided over by the Town Moderator, but he has no vote unless all the Members present and voting are equally divided. At the first Town Meeting following the annual town election, he is to appoint, subject to Town Meeting's confirmation, a Deputy Moderator from the elected Members. The Deputy serves in case of the Moderator's absence or disability. The current Town Moderator is Dan Driscoll.

Other boards and committees
The seven members of the School Committee are elected for three-year terms and appoint a Superintendent of Schools. They also set policy for the School Department. The School Committee is currently chaired by Melissa Pearrow, with Victor Hebert serving as Vice Chairperson. The other members of the committee are Josh Donati, Mayanne MacDonald Briggs, Cailen McCormick, Chris Polito, and Tracye White.

The three elected members of the Board of Assessors serve three-year terms and annually make a fair cash valuation of all property within the town. The current chair is Richard J. Schoenfeld. Michael T. Polito serves as Secretary. Cheryl Sullivan is also a member.

The three elected members of the Board of Health are responsible for the formulation and enforcement of rules and regulations affecting the environment and the public health. Currently the board is chaired by Leanne Jasset, B.S.P. RPH. Bernadette Chirokas and Noreen Guilfoyle also serve on the board.

The Board of Library Trustees has five members, each of whom serves three-year terms, and has care of the Town's public library at the Endicott Branch and Main Branch. The Board is responsible for all library policy, the library budget, and hiring and firing the library director. The current chair is Shirin Baradaran, with Tom Turner serving as Vice Chair. Annette Raphel serves as Secretary. Crystal Power and Brian Keaney also serve as members.

The five elected members of the Planning Board make studies and prepare plans concerning the resources, possibilities, and needs of the town. It also prepares the Master Plan. Currently the board is chaired by John Bethoney, with Michael A. Podolski, Esq. serving as vice-chair. James E. Brien IV serves as Clerk. James F. McGrail and Jessica Porter are also members. Andrew Pepoli serves as an unelected Associate.

There are five elected members of the Parks & Recreation Commission. Section 3-10 of the Town Charter states that the goal of the commission is to promote physical education, play, recreation, sport and other programs for people of all ages. The commission is currently chaired by Alix O'Connell, with Chuck Dello Iacono and Lisa Farnham serving as Vice Chair. Lisa Moran and Jon Briggs are also members.

There are five elected Commissioners of Trust Funds who manage and control all funds left, given, bequeathed, or devised to the town, and distribute the income in accordance with the terms of the respective trusts. The commission's Chair is Emily Reynolds, with Salvatore A Spada serving as Vice Chair. Nicole P Munchbach, Bob Desmond, and Dan Jon Oneil Jr. are also members.

There are five members of the Housing Authority Board. Four are elected by the Town and one is appointed by the Commonwealth Commissioner of Community Affairs. As members of the Board, they have all of the powers and duties which are given to housing authorities under the constitution and laws of the Commonwealth. The current chair is Donna M. Brown Rego and Margaret Matthews serves as the Assistant Chair & State Appointee. Skye Kessler serves as Treasurer, John B. Kane as Assistant Treasurer, and John Wagner as a member.

Politics

Presidential elections

U.S. Senate elections

U.S. House elections

Governor elections

Economy 

Dedham has been featured on both television and film screens.
 William Desmond Taylor's 1919 silent film Anne of Green Gables was filmed in Dedham. It was the favorite role of star Mary Miles Minter, but no copies of the film are known to have survived. The film also starred Paul Kelly.
 The 1973 film The Friends of Eddie Coyle was partially filmed in Dedham and starred Robert Mitchum, Peter Boyle, and Alex Rocco.
 In the 1980s, the Endicott Estate was featured in an episode of Spenser: For Hire.
 The 1982 film Pieces was filmed mainly in Madrid, but also included the same Dedham Square robbed in 'Eddie Coyle.'
 The Endicott Estate was also featured in the 2000 film The Perfect Storm.
 The award-winning 2000 film State and Main was filmed in Dedham, and Alec Baldwin's character slept in the Endicott Estate.
 In a 2004 episode of The Practice, viewers learned that Alan Shore grew up in the town, and numerous references to the Sacco and Vanzetti trial were also made. Images of Dedham Square, the Dedham Historical Society building and the courthouses were shot on location. In addition, "extremely rare" interior and exterior photos of the courthouses from the turn of the 20th century were shown.
 The 2010 thriller Shutter Island was partially filmed in Dedham. 
 The 2014 film The Judge was filmed partly in Dedham Square.
Kathryn Bigelow's 2017 film, Detroit, utilized the Dedham District Court as a filming location.
The film I Care a Lot was filmed at the Norfolk County Courthouse and Norfolk County Registry of Deeds.

Education

Public education 
The Dedham Public Schools operates seven schools and is known for the first implementation of a tax supported, free public school system, now used nationally.

 Dedham High School
 Dedham Middle School
 Avery Elementary School
 Oakdale Elementary School
 Greenlodge Elementary School
 Riverdale Elementary School
 Dr. Thomas J. Curren Early Childhood Education Center

Private education 
In addition, there are several private schools in the town, including:

 Noble and Greenough School, a private, co-educational day and boarding school for students in grades 7–12
 Dedham Country Day School, a private, co-educational, day school for students in pre-kindergarten to eighth grade
 Ursuline Academy, an independent college preparatory day school for young women in grades 7–12.
 The Rashi School, a Reform Jewish elementary and middle school.
 Little Sprouts Early Education and Childcare, a preschool and kindergarten.

Former schools 
 Ames School, a former public elementary school named after distinguished Dedham resident Fisher Ames.
 Charles J. Capen School, operated from 1931 to 1981, now home to the Dr. Thomas J. Curren Early Childhood Education Center
 St. Mary of the Assumption School, a former Catholic elementary school that operated as a part of St. Mary of the Assumption Parish until 1975.
 The Quincy School, a former public elementary school that operated until 1982.
 The Dexter School, a former public elementary school now operating as a private preschool and kindergarten, Little Sprouts Early Education and Childcare, Dedham location.

Higher education 
 Queen of Apostles Seminary, a former Catholic minor seminary run by the Society of African Missions, closed in the late 1960s
 Northeastern University Dedham Campus, a satellite campus located in the Queen of Apostles Seminary's former building

Places of worship

Boston United Hand in Hand Cemetery is located on Lower East Street straddling the West Roxbury line. Dating back to 1875, the original plot was full by 1896 but subsequently expanded a number of times. There are graves as recent as 1980 in the West Roxbury portion; the Dedham portion is still active. Chestnut Hill's Congregation Mishka Tefila currently owns the property.

Points of interest

 Organizations
 Dedham Historical Society and Museum
 Dedham Public Library
 Schools
 Dedham Country Day School
 Noble & Greenough School
 Ursuline Academy and Convent
 Dedham High School
 Businesses
 Dedham Health and Athletic Complex
 Legacy Place, outdoor shopping center.
 Moseley's on the Charles, the oldest continuous-running ballroom in the country
Areas
 Dedham Village Historic District
 Mother Brook (first man-made waterway in the United States)
 Buildings
 East Dedham Firehouse, possibly the oldest wood framed firehouse in use in the United States. Originally built in 1855, it was designed with stables in the basement for the horses that carried the apparatus.
 Ames Schoolhouse, schoolhouse built in 1897, now the Dedham town hall and senior center
 Endicott Estate
 Fairbanks House
 MIT Endicott House
 Norfolk County Correctional Center, situated in the median of Route 128.
 Old Norfolk County Jail
 Cemeteries
 Baby Cemetery
 Brookdale Cemetery
 Fairview Cemetery
 Old Village Cemetery

Transportation
Commuter rail service from Boston's South Station is provided by the MBTA with stops at Endicott and
Dedham Corporate Center on its Franklin Line. Also, MBTA bus routes 34 Dedham Square to Forest Hills serves Washington Street, Dedham Square, and the Dedham Mall, route 34E Walpole Center to Forest Hills serves Washington Street and Dedham Square, and route 35 Dedham Mall to Forest Hills serves Washington Street and the Dedham Mall.

Notable people

Sports

 Buck Danner, infielder for the Philadelphia Athletics
 Pete Hamilton, NASCAR driver
 Bill Hunnefield, infielder for Chicago White Sox (1926–1930), Cleveland Indians (1931), Boston Braves (1931) and New York Giants (1931)
 John Frederick Kiley outfielder for the Washington Nationals (1884) and Boston Beaneaters (1891)
 Lefty Mills, early American one-armed baseball player
 Sarah Parsons, member of the 2006 Winter Olympics women's hockey team
 Freddy Roach, professional boxer
 Warren Cummings Smith, alpine skier in the 2014 Winter Olympics men's giant slalom and slalom

Arts and literature

 Louisa May Alcott, author of Little Women, lived and worked for seven weeks during 1851 as a domestic helper in Dedham
 Tim Costello (1945–2009), labor and anti-globalization advocate and author
 Jacques d'Amboise, ballet dancer and choreographer
 George Derby, humorist
 Alvan Fisher, artist
 Reuben Guild, librarian and author
 Lilian Westcott Hale, artist
 Connie Hines, television actress
 Peter H. Reynolds, children's author and illustrator
 Anita Shreve, author
 Richard Trethewey, plumber on This Old House

Government

State

 Deborah R. Cochran, Representative to the Great and General Court
 Waldo Colburn (1824–1885), Massachusetts State Representative, Massachusetts State Supreme Court Justice
 Samuel Haven (1771–1847), Chief justice of the Court of Common Pleas
 Maryanne Lewis, Representative to the Great and General Court
 Horace Mann, education reformer and abolitionist
 Theron Metcalf, Associate Justice of the Massachusetts Supreme Judicial Court
 Charles M. McGowan, businessman and Representative to the Great and General Court
 Paul McMurtry, Representative to the Great and General Court
 Betty Jo Nelsen, member of the Wisconsin State Assembly
 Mason Sears (1899–1973), Representative to the Great and General Court and chairman of the Massachusetts Republican Party
 William Z. Stuart (1811–1876), Justice of the Indiana Supreme Court

Federal

 Fisher Ames, U.S. Representative
 Louis Brandeis, Associate Justice of the Supreme Court of the United States
 LeBaron Bradford Colt, U.S. Senator
 Samuel Dexter, U.S. Representative, Secretary of War, Secretary of the Treasury, administered oath of office to Chief Justice John Marshall
 Frederick D. Ely, U.S. Representative
 David Hackett, head of President's Committee on Juvenile Delinquency and Youth Crime, inspiration for Phineas in A Separate Peace
 John William McCormack, Speaker of U.S. House of Representatives
 John Lothrop Motley, historian, Minister to Great Britain, Minister to Austrian Empire
 Frederick J. Stimson, Ambassador to Argentina (1914–1921), Assistant Attorney General of Massachusetts
 George F. Williams, U.S. Representative, Ambassador to Greece and Montenegro, known as "sage of Dedham"

Military

 John Andrew Barnes, III, war hero, Medal of Honor recipient
 Ebenezer Battelle, Revolutionary War veteran
 Leon A. Edney, former Supreme Allied Commander, NATO Atlantic Forces, United States Atlantic Command, Commodore Admiral, US Navy
 William B. Gould, formerly enslaved Union Navy sailor
 James William Augustus Nicholson, Rear Admiral, U.S. Navy
 Thomas Sherwin, General in the Civil War
 Stephen Minot Weld Jr., Civil War hero

Religious

 Eliphalet Adams (1677–1753), clergyman and missionary to the Native Americans
 John Allin, patriarch of New England and signatory to the covenant
 Charles A. Finn, oldest priest in the United States and son of the oldest resident of Dedham

Miscellaneous

 Weaver W. Adams, chess master
 Nathaniel Ames, almanac-maker and physician
 Faxon Atherton, businessman and namesake of Atherton, California
 Jason Fairbanks, murderer
 Jonathan Fairbanks, builder of the Fairbanks House
 Temple Grandin, professor of animal science, inventor and autism advocate
 Samuel Foster Haven, archaeologist and anthropologist
 Eli Sagan (1927–2015), clothing manufacturer, lecturer and author in cultural anthropology and political activist who served on the national finance committee for George McGovern's 1972 presidential campaign, a role that earned him a spot on Richard Nixon's Enemies List in 1973
 Tommy Vietor, National Security Council spokesperson, podcast host of Pod Save America

References

Works cited

Further reading
 
 Cremin, Lawrence A., "American Education: The Colonial Experience 1607–1783," First Edition, New York, Harper & Row, Publishers, 1970.
 Hanson, Robert Brand, "Dedham, Massachusetts, 1635–1890," published by Dedham Historical Society, 1976

External links

 Dedham's official website
 Boston.com's Dedham news page

 
Towns in Norfolk County, Massachusetts
County seats in Massachusetts
Towns in Massachusetts
Populated places established in 1635
1635 establishments in Massachusetts